Mythical Kings and Iguanas is the second solo LP by Dory Previn, released in early 1971. Following her successful debut as a confessional singer-songwriter the previous year, it concentrated on the quest for spiritual fulfilment and a loving relationship.

Track listing
"Mythical Kings and Iguanas"
"Yada Yada la Scala"
"The Lady With the Braid"
"Her Mother's Daughter"
"Angels and Devils the Following Day"
"Mary C. Brown and the Hollywood Sign"
"Lemon Haired Ladies"
"Stone for Bessie Smith"
"The Game"
"Going Home"

Personnel
Dory Previn – Vocals, Guitar
Abbey Hall Singers – Backing Vocals
Murray Adler – Violin
Bud Brisbois – Trumpet
Denny Brooks – Backing Vocals
Conte Candoli – Trombone
David Cohen – Guitar
Buddy Collette – Clarinet
Rollice Dale – Viola
B.G. Davies – Backing Vocals
Brian Davies – Guitar
Phil Davis – Synthesiser
Jesse Ehrlich – Cello
Henry Ferber – Violin
Herbie Harper – Trombone
Paul Humphrey – Percussion
Harry Hyams – Viola
Peter Jameson – Guitar
Marilyn L. Johnson – French Horn
Tom Keene – Keyboards
Tom Sowell – Theremin/Moog Synthesizer
Ray Kelley – Cello
Lou Klass – Violin
Larry Knechtel – Keyboards
Bernard Kundell – Strings
Joy Lyle – Violin
Clark Maffitt – Guitar
Floyd C Maffitt – Backing Vocals
Judy Mayhan – Backing Vocals
Michael McGinnis – Backing Vocals
Peter Morse – Backing Vocals
Joe Osborn – Bass
Gale Robinson – French Horn
Ralph Schaeffer – Violin
Louie Shelton – Guitar
Ron Tutt – Drums
West Venet – Backing Vocals
Hamilton Wesley Watt – Guitar
Tibor Zelig – Violin
 Mike D. Stone of the Record Plant – engineer

Reception
Allmusic  [ link]

References

1971 albums
Dory Previn albums
Albums produced by Nick Venet
United Artists Records albums